R. Parthipan (born 4 June 1963) is an Indian politician and Member of Parliament elected from Tamil Nadu. He was elected to the Lok Sabha from Theni constituency as an Anna Dravida Munnetra Kazhagam candidate in 2014 election.

References 

1965 births
Living people
India MPs 2014–2019
People from Theni district
All India Anna Dravida Munnetra Kazhagam politicians
Lok Sabha members from Tamil Nadu